Hans Albin (27 July 1905 – 5 September 1988) was a German actor, film producer and film director.

Selected filmography
 Homecoming to Happiness (1933)
 Three Bluejackets and a Blonde (1933)
 The Champion of Pontresina  (1934)
 Heinz in the Moon (1934)
 Gypsy Blood (1934)
 Miss Madame (1934)
 Love Conquers All (1934)
 The Four Musketeers (1934)
 A Night of Change (1935)
 The Model Husband (1937)
 Carnival in White (1952)
 Stars Over Colombo (1953)
 Spring Song (1954)
 The Prisoner of the Maharaja  (1954)
 I'll See You at Lake Constance (1956)
 Games of Desire (1964)
  (1968)
 Hugo, the Woman Chaser (1969)

References

Bibliography
 Goble, Alan. The Complete Index to Literary Sources in Film. Walter de Gruyter, 1999.

External links

1905 births
1988 deaths
Film people from Berlin
German male film actors
Male actors from Berlin
20th-century German male actors